is a Japanese retail company that operates two department stores: Sogo, and Seibu. It is a subsidiary of Seven & I Holdings Co.

See also

Department stores in Japan

External links

  

 
Seven & I Holdings
Retail companies based in Tokyo
Retail companies established in 2009